"Drug Dealers Anonymous" is a song by American rapper Pusha T. It was released on May 31, 2016. The hip-hop track was produced by DJ Dahi and features a guest appearance from American rapper Jay-Z.

Release history

References

2016 singles
2016 songs
Pusha T songs
Jay-Z songs
Songs written by Pusha T
Songs written by Jay-Z
Songs written by Juvenile (rapper)
Songs written by Mannie Fresh
Songs written by DJ Dahi